Vriesea fenestralis is a species of flowering plant in the Bromeliaceae family. It is endemic to Brazil.

Cultivars 
 Vriesea 'Burgundy Bubbles'
 Vriesea 'Caramel Fudge'
 Vriesea 'El Supremo'
 Vriesea 'Elfi Natascha'
 Vriesea 'Emerald Meadows'
 Vriesea 'Fenestralo-Fulgida'
 Vriesea 'Fenestralo-Rex'
 Vriesea 'Frost Bite'
 Vriesea 'Ginoti'
 Vriesea 'Kakadu'
 Vriesea 'Magnisiana'
 Vriesea 'Magnusiana'
 Vriesea 'Mandy'
 Vriesea 'Mortfontanensis'
 Vriesea 'Natascha'
 Vriesea 'Red Ladder'
 Vriesea 'Sassie Sue'
 Vriesea 'Sphinx'
 Vriesea 'You Beaut'

References 

BSI Cultivar Registry Retrieved 11 October 2009

fenestralis
Flora of Brazil
Taxa named by Jean Jules Linden
Taxa named by Édouard André